Geofredo de Sousa Cheung (born 18 May 1979), also known in Chinese as Cheung Chit Un, is a Macanese retired footballer.

References 

1979 births
Living people
Macau footballers
Macau international footballers
C.D. Monte Carlo players
G.D. Lam Pak players
Association football midfielders
Footballers at the 2006 Asian Games
Asian Games competitors for Macau